Elizabeth Lake is a census-designated place (CDP) and unincorporated community on Elizabeth Lake (lake), in Los Angeles County, California, United States. As of the 2010 census it had a population of 1,756.

Geography
The community of Elizabeth Lake borders the unincorporated community of Lake Hughes, sharing the same ZIP Code (93532). It is located in the northern Sierra Pelona Mountains, at the edge of the western Antelope Valley and Mojave Desert.

Elizabeth Lake and Hughes Lake are in canyons along the San Andreas Fault. Both lakes dry up periodically depending on rainfall cycles.

History
Known then as "La Laguna de Chico Lopez", Elizabeth Lake was a watering locale on Spanish colonial and Mexican El Camino Viejo in Alta California and the Gold Rush era Stockton–Los Angeles Road. From 1858 to 1861 it was between the Widow Smith's Station and Mud Spring stage stops of the Butterfield Overland Mail. The lake area was to the west of Rancho La Liebre, an 1846 Mexican land grant now part of Tejon Ranch.

In 1907 William Mulholland, superintendent of the Los Angeles Department of Water and Power, started work on the Elizabeth Lake Tunnel for transporting water in the Los Angeles Aqueduct from Owens Valley to Los Angeles. The  tunnel is  under the valley floor. The tunnel was driven from both ends. The north portal is at Fairmont Reservoir and the south in Bear Canyon (now Portal Canyon) northwest of Green Valley. This  tunnel was driven  through solid rock and met in the center within 1½ inches in line and 5/8 inches in depth. The Elizabeth Lake tunnel was the largest single construction project on the Los Angeles Aqueduct and set speed records in its day.

Demographics

At the 2010 census Elizabeth Lake had a population of 1,756. The racial makeup of Elizabeth Lake was 1,591 (90.6%) White (81.2% Non-Hispanic White), 21 (1.2%) African American, 9 (0.5%) Native American, 23 (1.3%) Asian, 1 (0.1%) Pacific Islander, 47 (2.7%) from other races, and 64 (3.6%) from two or more races. Hispanic or Latino of any race were 231 people (13.2%).

The whole population lived in households, no one lived in non-institutionalized group quarters and no one was institutionalized.

There were 674 households, 223 (33.1%) had children under the age of 18 living in them, 399 (59.2%) were opposite-sex married couples living together, 54 (8.0%) had a female householder with no husband present, 36 (5.3%) had a male householder with no wife present.  There were 26 (3.9%) unmarried opposite-sex partnerships, and 7 (1.0%) same-sex married couples or partnerships. 151 households (22.4%) were one person and 38 (5.6%) had someone living alone who was 65 or older. The average household size was 2.61.  There were 489 families (72.6% of households); the average family size was 3.05.

The age distribution was 403 people (22.9%) under the age of 18, 155 people (8.8%) aged 18 to 24, 407 people (23.2%) aged 25 to 44, 643 people (36.6%) aged 45 to 64, and 148 people (8.4%) who were 65 or older.  The median age was 42.4 years. For every 100 females, there were 109.3 males.  For every 100 females age 18 and over, there were 108.8 males.

There were 745 housing units at an average density of 113.9 per square mile, of the occupied units 561 (83.2%) were owner-occupied and 113 (16.8%) were rented. The homeowner vacancy rate was 3.1%; the rental vacancy rate was 5.8%.  1,466 people (83.5% of the population) lived in owner-occupied housing units and 290 people (16.5%) lived in rental housing units.

According to the 2010 United States Census, Elizabeth Lake had a median household income of $67,614, with 6.0% of the population living below the federal poverty line.

See also
Elizabeth Lake (Los Angeles County, California)
Hughes Lake (California)
Lake Hughes, California — the town
Angeles National Forest
 – related topics

References

External links
Lakes Community Center
Hughes Elizabeth Lakes Union School

Census-designated places in Los Angeles County, California
Populated places in the Mojave Desert
Sierra Pelona Ridge
Angeles National Forest
Census-designated places in California